Higham railway station is in the hamlet of Lower Higham in north Kent.

Train services have been operated by Thameslink since May 2018. Before that time, the services were operated by Southeastern and its predecessors, although the station is still managed by Southeastern.

The ticket office, on the 'up' side, is situated in the substantial station building. This is staffed only during part of the day; at other times a PERTIS passenger-operated ticket machine issues 'Permits to Travel' - which are exchanged on-train or at staffed stations for travel tickets - and is located at the entrance to the up platform, at the foot of the staircase.

From Higham to Strood, the railway passes through a tunnel built for the Thames and Medway Canal, and the station building was converted from the home of the canal towing contractor. The waiting room was heated by the original open fire until as recently as the 1980s.

History
One of the more unusual pieces of freight handled by the station was a Swiss chalet, in 94 separate pieces, packed into 58 boxes. It arrived over Christmas 1864 as a gift for Charles Dickens at nearby Gad's Hill.

According to the Official Handbook of Stations the following classes of traffic were being handled at this station in 1956: G,  P, L, H, C and there was a 1-ton 2 cwt crane.

Services 

Off-peak, all services at Higham are operated by Thameslink using  EMUs.

The typical off-peak service in trains per hour is:
 2 tph to  via  and 
 2 tph to 

During the peak hours, there are additional services from Strood to London Charing Cross via  and to London Cannon Street, operated by Southeastern.

References

External links 

 Higham (Kent) station on navigable 1946 O.S. map

Gravesham
Railway stations in Kent
DfT Category E stations
Former South Eastern Railway (UK) stations
Railway stations in Great Britain opened in 1845
Railway stations in Great Britain closed in 1846
Railway stations in Great Britain opened in 1847
Railway stations served by Southeastern
1847 establishments in England
Railway stations served by Govia Thameslink Railway